Comedy Central Stand-Up Presents, formerly known as The Half Hour, is an American stand-up comedy television series that airs on Comedy Central in the United States. The program features various stand-up comedians in each episode. It replaced the similar program Comedy Central Presents in 2012.

Premise
The Half Hour shines a spotlight on some of the funniest and most unusual voices in stand-up comedy.

Overview
Every episode features an up-and-coming comedian or sometimes a group performing an original set of stand-up. The first four seasons of the show where filmed at the Royale theatre in Boston, Massachusetts. Beginning with the fifth season, the comedians now perform their sets at the Civic Theatre in New Orleans, Louisiana. It was announced that a sixth season was picked up with 14 new stand-up comedians given their own set. It was also announced that the show will be retitled Comedy Central Stand-Up Presents.

Episodes

Season 1 (2012)

Season 2 (2013–14)

Season 3 (2014)

Season 4 (2015)

Season 5 (2016)

Season 6 (2017)

Season 7 (2018)

Season 8 (2019)

References

External links
 
 

Comedy Central original programming
2010s American stand-up comedy television series
2012 American television series debuts
English-language television shows